Bolton Wanderers Football Club, an English association football club based in Bolton, Greater Manchester, England was founded in 1874 as Christ Church Football Club before adopting its current name in 1877. Bolton were one of the 12 founder members of the Football League, which formed in 1888. The club has remained in the Football League since it was established competing in its various divisions. As of the end of 2020–21, the club's first team has spent 74 seasons in the first tier of English football, 33 in the second, 13 in the third and two in the fourth. They are currently competing in EFL League One, the third tier.

Bolton Wanderers' record against each club faced league competition is listed below. Bolton's first league game was a 6–3 defeat against Derby County in the inaugural 1888–89 Football League; since then they have played 110 different teams. They met their most recent different league opponent, Morecambe, for the first time in the 2020–21 EFL League Two season. The teams that Bolton Wanderers have met most in league competition are Aston Villa and Blackburn Rovers, against whom they have contested 156 league matches. Bolton have recorded more victories against Blackburn than any other club, with 64. West Bromwich Albion drew 44 of their 106 league encounters with Bolton, more than any other club. The team have lost more league matches to Everton than to any other club, having been beaten by them 70 times in 138 encounters.

Key
 The table includes results of matches played by Bolton Wanderers in the English Football League and Premier League.
 For the sake of simplicity, present-day names are used throughout: for example, results against Newton Heath, Small Heath and Woolwich Arsenal are integrated into the records against Manchester United, Birmingham City and Arsenal, respectively
   Teams with this background and symbol in the "Club" column are competing in the 2022–23 EFL League One alongside Bolton
   Clubs with this background and symbol in the "Club" column are defunct
 P = matches played; W = matches won; D = matches drawn; L = matches lost; F = goals for; A = goals against; Win% = percentage of total matches won
 The columns headed "First" and "Last" contain the first and most recent seasons in which Bolton played league matches against each opponent

All-time league record
All statistics are correct up to and including the match played on 17 March 2023.

Notes

References

External links
 

league records by opponent
English football club league records by opponent